Typhoon Higos was, at that time, considered the third strongest typhoon to affect Tokyo since World War II. The 21st named storm of the 2002 Pacific typhoon season, Higos developed on September 25 east of the Northern Marianas Islands. It tracked west-northwestward for its first few days, steadily intensifying into a powerful typhoon by September 29. Higos subsequently weakened and turned to the north-northeast toward Japan, making landfall in that country's Kanagawa Prefecture on October 1. It weakened while crossing Honshu, and shortly after striking Hokkaidō, Higos became extratropical on October 2. The remnants passed over Sakhalin and dissipated on October 4.

Before striking Japan, Higos produced strong winds in the Northern Marianas Islands while passing to their north. These winds damaged the food supply on two islands. A total of 608,130 buildings in the country were left without power, and two people were electrocuted in the storm's aftermath. The rains flooded houses across the country and caused mudslides. High waves washed 25 boats ashore and killed one person along the coast. Damage in the country totaled JP¥261 billion ($2.14 billion in 2002 USD), and there were five deaths in the country. Later, the remnants of Higos affected the Russian Far East, killing seven people involved in two shipwrecks offshore Primorsky Krai.

Meteorological history

The Joint Typhoon Warning Center (JTWC) first monitored an area of disturbed weather on September 25. At the time, the system consisted of a weak circulation, but with good outflow and located in an area of low wind shear. The system moved to the west-northwest, steered by a subtropical ridge to the east of Japan. Later that day, the Japan Meteorological Agency (JMA) upgraded the depression to Tropical Storm Higos, at the same time that the JTWC also upgraded to a tropical storm. By that time, the system had developed an organized area of convection.

The storm gradually intensified while passing to the north of Saipan, and Higos attained typhoon status on September 27. Shortly thereafter, it also passed just south of Pagan Island. A well-defined eye  in diameter developed, and Higos rapidly intensified. At 1200 UTC on September 29, Typhoon Higos reached its peak intensity. After having moved west-northwestward for several days, Higos slowed and began turning to the north while it was at peak strength. Its change in movement was due to an eastward-moving trough creating a weakness in the ridge. The typhoon accelerated to the north-northeast toward Japan and gradually weakened due to increasing wind shear.

Higos passed very near Tokyo around 1200 UTC that day, becoming the third strongest typhoon to affect the city since World War II, according to the JTWC. The typhoon weakened into a tropical storm while crossing Honshu. Higos briefly emerged over waters, before making a second landfall on Tomakomai, Hokkaidō at 2100 UTC on October 1. By that time, the storm was beginning to transition into an extratropical cyclone, and at 0600 UTC on October 2 Higos completed the transition. Simultaneously, the JTWC discontinued advisories. The storm continued to the north before crossing Sakhalin. The remnants dissipated on October 4 just west of the Kamchatka Peninsula.

Preparations and impact

The typhoon caused heavy crop damage in Agrigan and Alamagan, which led to food shortages on the islands. As a result, officials from Saipan sent a boat to the islands with food donated by the local Red Cross chapter.

Before Higos struck Japan, officials canceled 300 airplane flights, and also canceled train lines and ferry service. Some baseball games were postponed, and businesses closed early. The typhoon affected outlying islands of Japan, causing power outages due to strong winds. Winds in Tokyo reached . Several stations across Japan reported record-high wind gusts. The typhoon washed 25 boats ashore, including a cargo ship on Izu-Oshima Island. One woman was washed away by high surf.

A total of 2,254 houses were flooded in the country, forcing thousands of people to evacuate. Overall, 2,694 houses were damaged, and another 12 were destroyed. Many houses lost their roofs, and high winds left 608,130 buildings without power in Honshu, along with thousands of power on Hokkaido. Two people were electrocuted by downed power lines. High rainfall caused mudslides near Tokyo, which destroyed a few buildings, and caused the Tama River to reach above-normal levels. Across Japan, the typhoon disrupted transportation by forcing highways to be closed. Storm debris injured several people, and a steel window frame struck and killed a man in Yokohama. A tree fell onto a car, injuring one person. Insured damage in Japan totaled ¥261 billion ($2.14 billion in 2002 USD). In Iwate Prefecture, there was about ¥8 billion ($73 million 2002 USD) in damage, mostly from damaged roads and public buildings. Agriculture damage in the prefecture exceeded ¥2 billion ($18.3 million in 2002 USD) for the first time since Typhoon Mireille in 1991. There were five deaths, and 108 people were injured; this included 55 people who were injured in Tokyo.

After becoming extratropical, Higos affected the Kuril Islands and later Sakhalin. Power was cut in 22 towns, and ferry service was canceled. On Sakhalin, high winds downed many trees, some of which blocked roads. Six people were injured by fallen trees. The remnants of Higos capsized two ships offshore Primorye, killing seven people.

Notes

References

External links

JMA General Information of Typhoon Higos (0221) from Digital Typhoon
JMA Best Track Data of Typhoon Higos (0221) 
JMA Best Track Data (Graphics) of Typhoon Higos (0221)
JMA Best Track Data (Text)
JTWC Best Track Data of Super Typhoon 25W (Higos)
25W.HIGOS from the U.S. Naval Research Laboratory

2002 Pacific typhoon season
Typhoons in the Northern Mariana Islands
Typhoons in Japan
Typhoons in Russia
Typhoons
September 2002 events in Asia
October 2002 events in Asia
2002 disasters in Russia
Higos